Platyoposaurus was a temnospondyl from the Middle Permian epoch about 270-268 Mya.

Discovery

 
One of the discoveries includes a skull 28 cm long with a purported body length of 250 cm representing a carnivorous adult specimen.

The fossil remains were found in Belebey in Bashkortostan, Russia; the name Platyoposaurus means "flat-faced lizard" and was coined after the original name Platyops turned out to be preoccupied.

References

Permian temnospondyls
Fossils of Russia
Prehistoric amphibian genera